On-Off is the fifth album in Marcin Rozynek's music career and third artist's solo album. It was released on 11 September 2006.

Track listing 
"Deszczowe dni" - 4:20 (Rainy days)
"Historia miłosna '06" - 4:11 (Love story 2006)
"O takich jak ja i ty" - 4:19 (About people like me and you)
"Jeśli pragniesz" - 3:32 (If you desire)
"Każde wielkie" - 4:06 (Every great)
"Przybysze" - 3:58 (The visitor)
"Objęcie bessy" - 4:11  
"Nocy ciemność rozwieszona nad głowami miast" - 5:03 (The darkness of the night hanged up over the cities heads)
"Podróże w czasie i przestrzeni" - 3:48 (Journeys through time and space)
"Davos" - 3:46 
"Najpiękniejsza katastrofa" - 4:04 (The most beautiful disaster)

Singles 
"Historia miłosna '06" (2006)
"Deszczowe dni" (2006)
"O takich jak ja i ty" (2006)
"Jeśli pragniesz" (2007)

External links
 Label's note about the album

2006 albums
Marcin Rozynek albums